US Railcar is a manufacturer of railroad rolling stock, including passenger cars, and diesel multiple units. It was formed in 2009, and is the successor company to Colorado Railcar after that company shut down in December 2008.

History
US Railcar's predecessor, Colorado Railcar, ceased operations on 23 December 2008 because of a "major liquidity problem". The business remained closed until July 2009 when a group of investors, part of the Value Recovery Group (VRG), purchased the assets of Colorado Railcar and renamed the company US Railcar. The new company operated as a subsidiary of VRG, with the headquarters of both companies located in Columbus, Ohio.

On 18 February 2010, US Railcar announced that it had formed a joint venture with American Railcar Industries, dubbed US Railcar Company LLC, to better "design, manufacture, and sell Diesel Multiple Units." On 19 November 2010, however, the two companies announced the dissolution of the venture, citing "current market conditions" as the reason. The National Association of Railroad Passengers speculated that the cause of the failure of the joint venture was the cancellation of the proposed 3-C passenger corridor in Ohio.

Facilities
US Railcar currently operates no construction facilities; any products ordered from the company would be built by American Railcar under contract. The company plans to construct a facility in Gahanna, Ohio, near the John Glenn Columbus International Airport, which would be built with a mix of public and private funds. US Railcar applied for an $8.7 million grant from the federal government, but the application was denied. The state of Ohio has offered the company $3.6 million in financial assistance, and private investment would provide the remainder of the necessary money to build the factory, estimated to cost around $14 million. It would employ up to 200 people.

Products
US Railcar offers diesel multiple units in both single- and bi-level versions, as well as unpowered railcars in single- and bi-level versions. The single-level DMUs have a passenger capacity of 94, while the bi-level models can carry 188 passengers. Both types are equipped with two  Detroit Diesel engines for propulsion. The single-level railcars have a capacity of 102 people, while the bi-level cars can seat 218. The company also offers unpowered luxury railcars, dubbed the "Ultradome."

See also
List of rolling stock manufacturers

References

Vehicle manufacturing companies established in 2009
Rolling stock manufacturers of the United States
Companies based in the Columbus, Ohio metropolitan area
Manufacturing companies based in Ohio
2009 establishments in Ohio